A Kilner jar is a rubber-sealed, screw-topped jar used for preserving (bottling) food.  It was first produced by John Kilner & Co., Yorkshire, England.

History 

The Kilner Jar was originally invented by John Kilner (1792–1857) and associates, and made by a firm of glass bottlemakers from Yorkshire called Kilner which he set up. The original Kilner bottlemakers operated from 1842, when the company was first founded, until 1937, when the company went into liquidation. 

In 2003, The Rayware Group purchased the Ravenhead name, including the design, patent and trademark of the original Kilner jar and continues to produce them today in China.

A more detailed history of the companies  by the Society for Historical Archeology is available, but care should be taken in its referencing.

Other 
In an episode of the BBC's Who Do You Think You Are?, the former Top Gear television presenter Jeremy Clarkson found out that he is a great-great-great-great grandson of John Kilner.

Company names
The various names of the Kilner companies were:
John Kilner and Co, Castleford, Yorkshire, 1842–44 
John Kilner and Sons, Wakefield, Yorkshire, 1847–57 
Kilner Brothers Glass Co, Thornhill Lees, Yorkshire, 1857–73 also at Conisbrough, Yorkshire, 1863–1873 
Kilner Brothers Ltd, Thornhill Lees, Yorkshire 1873–1920 also at Conisbrough, Yorkshire, 1873–1937.

See also

 Mason jar
 Weck jar
 Fowler's Vacola jar
 Food preservation
 Home canning
 Screw cap
 Sterilisation

References

Glass jars
Canned food
Food storage containers